Beñat Albizuri Aransolo (born May 17, 1981 in Berriz, Basque Country) is a Spanish former professional road bicycle racer, who rode professionally between 2006 and 2008, entirely for .

External links
Team Profile (in Spanish)
Eurosport Profile

Palmarès

1981 births
Living people
People from Durangaldea
Cyclists from the Basque Country (autonomous community)
Spanish male cyclists
Sportspeople from Biscay